Nalbandyan (also Romanized as Nalbandian; formerly Shahriar), is a major village in the Armavir Province of Armenia near the Armenia–Turkey border. It is named after poet Mikael Nalbandian. 20% of the population (around 895 individuals) in Nalbandyan are from the Yazidi minority.

See also 
Armavir Province

References 

World Gazeteer: Armenia – World-Gazetteer.com

Populated places in Armavir Province
Yazidi villages